The Mangshan horned toad (Xenophrys mangshanensis), or Mangshan spadefoot toad, is a species of frog in the family Megophryidae. It is endemic to China and known only from southern Hunan and northern Guangdong; its type locality is Mount Mang (Mangshan) in Yizhang County, Hunan. Its natural habitats are subtropical or tropical moist lowland forests, subtropical or tropical moist montane forests, and rivers. It is threatened by habitat loss.

References

Xenophrys
Amphibians of China
Endemic fauna of China
Taxonomy articles created by Polbot
Amphibians described in 1990